Cophanta funestalis is a moth of the family Noctuidae first described by Francis Walker in 1864. It is found in Indo-Australian tropics of India, Sri Lanka, Thailand, Borneo, New Guinea and Australia.

Forewings brownish with variable pale spots and dark bands. Hindwings whitish without markings.

References

Moths of Asia
Moths described in 1864
Acontiinae